James Brittain (born 25 September 1785) was an English cricketer who was associated with Nottingham Cricket Club and made his first-class debut in 1827. He played for Nottingham from 1813 to 1829.

References

1785 births
Year of death unknown
English cricketers
English cricketers of 1826 to 1863
Nottingham Cricket Club cricketers
Cricketers from Nottingham